Longtousi Park Station is a station on Line 10 of Chongqing Rail Transit in Chongqing municipality, China. It is located in Yubei District and opened in 2017.

Station structure
There are 2 island platforms at this station, but only 2 inner platforms are used for local trains to stop, and for rapid trains to pass, while the other 2 outer platforms are reserved.

References

Railway stations in Chongqing
Railway stations in China opened in 2017
Chongqing Rail Transit stations